The 2015 AFC Beach Soccer Championship was a beach soccer tournament which took place in Doha, Qatar on 23–28 March 2015. This was the second consecutive time that the AFC Beach Soccer Championship was held in Doha. All matches were played at the Katara Beach.

The tournament served as the FIFA Beach Soccer World Cup qualifier for teams from Asia which are members of AFC, where the top three teams qualified for the 2015 FIFA Beach Soccer World Cup in Portugal. In the final, Oman defeated Japan to be crowned champions, and both teams together with third place Iran qualified for the 2015 FIFA Beach Soccer World Cup.

Participating teams and draw
The following 15 teams entered the tournament. Palestine initially entered but then had to withdraw.

 (withdrew)
 (hosts)

The draw of the tournament was held on 18 February 2015 at Doha. The 15 teams were drawn into three groups of four teams and one group of three teams.

Group stage
Each team earns three points for a win in regulation time, two points for a win in extra time, one point for a win in a penalty shoot-out, and no points for a defeat.

All times are local, Arabia Standard Time (UTC+3).

Group A

Group B

Group C

Group D

Knockout stage

Bracket

Quarter-finals

Fifth place semi-finals

Semi-finals

Seventh place match

Fifth place match

Third place match

Final

Final ranking

Awards

Note: Goto won top scorer award based on tiebreaker.

Top goalscorers
8 goals

 Takasuke Goto
 Moreira Ozu
 Bùi Trần Tuấn Anh

7 goals

 Mohammad Ahmadzadeh
 Haitham Fattal
 Yahya Al-Araimi
 Ghaith Abdullah Subait
 Ali Hassan Karim

6 goals

 Rashed Jamal
 Ali Al-Saif

References

External links
, beachsoccer.com
, the-AFC.com
, FIFA.com
Technical Report and Statistics, AFC

Qualification AFC
2015
2015 in beach soccer